Rusena Gelanteh (born 6 March 1968) is an Indonesian archer. She competed in the women's individual and team events at the 1992 Summer Olympics.

References

1968 births
Living people
Indonesian female archers
Olympic archers of Indonesia
Archers at the 1992 Summer Olympics
Place of birth missing (living people)
Archers at the 1994 Asian Games
Medalists at the 1994 Asian Games
Asian Games medalists in archery
Asian Games silver medalists for Indonesia
20th-century Indonesian women
21st-century Indonesian women